Sardar Amjad Ali (born 1943) is an Indian politician, Diplomat and one of the top lawyers of East India. Who served as Member of Lok Sabha from Basirhat in 1970 representing Bangla Congress and elected to the upper house of parliament, Rajya Sabha in 1972. As a close aide of the Gandhi family, he was sent to the United Nations for 9 years. He has been elected president of the Bar council numerous times and is one the most prominent lawyers in East India. He joined Trinamool Congress in 2010 and fought 2011 West Bengal Legislative Assembly elections from Basirhat Uttar. He was Member of Rajya Sabha from 1972 to 1978.

References 

Living people
India MPs 1967–1970
Rajya Sabha members from West Bengal
Bangla Congress politicians
Trinamool Congress politicians from West Bengal
1943 births